The Canadian Swing Championships commonly known as CSC is an annual event held since 2002 to showcase swing dancing Canada. It is held near Montreal during Victoria Day weekend. Before 2005, the event was called the Eastern Canadian Swing Championship, but it was renamed when no equivalent event was started in Western Canada and the ECSC became the de facto national championship.

In 2019, the Canadian Swing Championship celebrated its 18th year.

At CSC, competitions are held in lindy hop, classic lindy hop, west coast swing, charleston, balboa, blues dancing, jive, and a fast dance.  Competitions are divided into jack and jill format and rehearsed routines for pairs and for teams.  In some events, separate competitions are held for professionals and amateurs

In addition to the competition itself, the weekend acts as a lindy exchange, including instructional workshops and social dancing.  It is the largest annual exchange in Canada, attracting over 500 people per year to full-event participation, plus the numbers attending only as observers.

There are different sections, each with different rules. The sections include: Amateur Team Showcase, Team Showcase, Classic Swing Couples, Showcase Swing Couples, Pro-am, Short Showcase, Rising Star, Cabaret (crazy and solo), Canadian Showcase, Strictly Lindy Hop, and more.

Prior to the MeToo Movement it served as a platform for the shake up of traditional gender roles in the Canadian and Quebec swing dance scenes and is credited as a major driving force behind the high level of competitive success of swing dancers from Quebec and Canada on the international competitive circuit

References

External links
 Official website

Lindy Hop